Benjámin Grátz (born 16 February 1996) is a Hungarian swimmer. He competed in the men's 4 × 200 metre freestyle relay event at the 2016 Summer Olympics.

In 2014, he won the gold medal in the boys' 200 metre individual medley at the 2014 Summer Youth Olympics held in Nanjing, China. He also won the silver medal in the boys' 200 metre butterfly event.

References

External links
 

 

1996 births
Living people
Hungarian male swimmers
Olympic swimmers of Hungary
Swimmers at the 2016 Summer Olympics
Swimmers at the 2014 Summer Youth Olympics
Swimmers from Budapest
Youth Olympic gold medalists for Hungary
20th-century Hungarian people
21st-century Hungarian people